The Suining–Chengdu railway or Suicheng railway is a double-track, electrified railway in Sichuan Province of southwest China. The railway is named after its two terminal cities, Suining and Chengdu, and forms a segment of the Shanghai–Wuhan–Chengdu passenger railway. It was built as part of the Dazhou–Chengdu Railway. On 7 July 2009, the high-speed track was duplicated and these two tracks were subsequently designated as the Suining–Chengdu railway. The original low-speed, single track line between Chengdu and Suining remains as part of the Dazhou–Chengdu railway and is now mainly used for freight traffic.

References

Rail transport in Sichuan
Railway lines opened in 2006
25 kV AC railway electrification